Frans Karjagin (12 June 1909 – 16 July 1977) was a Finnish footballer and bandy player.

Football career
He earned 57 caps at international level between 1929 and 1943. He also represented Finland at the 1936 Summer Olympics.

At club level Karjagin played for HPS, Töölön Vesa and HIFK.

Bandy career
He capped 12 times at international level.

Honours

Football
Finnish Championship: 1930, 1931, 1933, 1937

Bandy
Bandyliiga: 1934, 1935, 1938, 1939, 1941, 1944

References

External links

1909 births
1977 deaths
Finnish footballers
Finland international footballers
Finnish bandy players
Association football defenders
HIFK Fotboll players
Olympic footballers of Finland
Footballers at the 1936 Summer Olympics